The 1954–55 Topps hockey set was Topps' first attempt at producing trading cards for the National Hockey League. At the time, the league consisted of six teams known as the Original Six. Topps included all four American teams in this popular 60-card set - Boston Bruins, Chicago Black Hawks, Detroit Red Wings, and New York Rangers.

As noted on most packaging, the Topps cards were made and printed in U.S.A. Cards were sold in 5-cent packs and 1-cent packs. As written on select packaging, the series was also made and distributed by O-Pee-Chee Co., Ltd. London, Ontario, Canada under license with Topps Chewing Gum Inc., Brooklyn, N.Y.

History
Each card in this set measures approximately 2 in. x 3 in., and features a player photo (in a blue and red line background), team logo, team name, position, and a facsimile autograph. As is typical of most trading cards, the back of the card features biographical information, statistics from the 1953–54 season, and a few notes featuring hockey facts.  After this season Topps did not produce a hockey set again for another two years until the 1957 set because the NHL went after Topps for not getting their permission to use the team logos in the card photos.

Card trading
While the set is printed in the United States, a large portion of the actual print run found its way to Canada, as baseball was America's national pastime.

As far as the hobby of trading cards is concerned, this set features only three Rookie Cards, including #18 Doug Mohns, #32 Camille Henry, and #35 Don McKenney. The inclusion of a very early Gordie Howe card is one of the main draws of this set, and the card can be seen trading in the $2000 range when in Near Mint condition.  A PSA 9 1954 Topps Gordie Howe card sold for $10,000.00 in the early 2000s.

Cards #1 and #60 are considered to be condition sensitive for two reasons. The first is their placement on the sheet during printing, and the second reason is due to the "rubber band" factor. The "rubber band" factor occurs when a tight rubber band is used to hold a stack of trading cards together, thus damaging the first and last cards in the stack. And in the case of complete sets, this would be cards #1 and #60.  A PSA 8 Milt Schmidt #60 sold on eBay in 2005 for $6,000.00.

Another condition sensitive challenge in this set are gum stains. Topps included a stick of bubble gum in every pack a collector would purchase. Two kinds of packs were distributed: Penny packs and nickel packs. Penny packs included only one card increasing the chance greatly of an unsightly gum stain tainting that card.

Card checklist

National Hockey League mass media
Trading cards
Topps Hockey